Cezaro Rossetti (1901 –8 May 1950) was a Scottish Esperanto writer.

Of Italian-Swiss derivation, he was born in Glasgow and lived in Britain. Together with his younger brother, Reto Rossetti, he learned Esperanto in 1928.  He studied in Bombay as a restaurant manager, worked as a cook, briefly as a peddler, and afterwards as a hawker at fairs.

Cezaro Rossetti's novel Kredu min, sinjorino! (Believe me, Ma'am!), written at his brother's instigation and reflecting in part his own life experiences, has been translated into Hungarian, Japanese, Polish, and English.  In 2013 the Milan Esperanto Club prepared a translation into Italian, which was then published by the Italian Esperanto Federation.

References 

The first version of this article was based on a translation of the corresponding article in the Esperanto Wikipedia, with additional information from the external page at esperanto.net indicated below.

External links 
 
  
 Short bio with photo. 
 Sperto saĝon akrigas. a review of the Rossetti brothers by Baldur Ragnarsson, originally published in Juna Amiko. 

1901 births
1950 deaths
Scottish novelists
Writers of Esperanto literature
Writers from Glasgow
People of Swiss-Italian descent
Scottish people of Swiss descent
Scottish Esperantists
20th-century British novelists